Kim Bong-Kyum (born 1 May 1984) is a South Korean football player.

Club career 

In 2007, he joined Korea National League side Ulsan Hyundai Mipo Dockyard.

On 18 November 2008, Kim, as one of sixteen priority members, joined newly established club Gangwon FC under former Ulsan Hyundai Mipo Dockyard manager Choi Soon-Ho as a foundation player.  The club was making its debut for the 2009 K-League season. He scored his first and second goals in the same match against Seongnam on 21 June 2009. Kim made regular appearances throughout 2009 for Gangwon, but saw less game time the following year.

Leaving Gangwon at the conclusion of the 2010 K-League season, Kim dropped down to the National League, in a return to former club Ulsan Hyundai Mipo Dockyard.

Club career statistics

Honours

Club
Ulsan Hyundai Mipo Dockyard
Korea National League (2) : 2007, 2008
Korean President's Cup (1) : 2008

References

External links

1984 births
Living people
South Korean footballers
Gangwon FC players
K League 1 players
Association football defenders